Stefano da San Gregorio was a 17th-century Italian mathematician and theologian from the Order of Discalced Augustinians.

Works

References

17th-century Italian mathematicians
17th-century Roman Catholic theologians
17th-century deaths